The Decora longicorn beetle (Amphirhoe decora) is a species of the family Cerambycidae.

Description
This beetle is approximately 18mm in length. It is predominantly dark brown in various shades of red and has a white stripe over each of its two wing covers. Its femurs are the largest of all longicorn beetles. As is typical for longicorn beetles, its antennae are extremely long - three times the length of its body.

References

Cerambycinae
Beetles described in 1840